Steve Phipps is an American football coach.  He was the head football coach at McPherson College in McPherson, Kansas, serving for two seasons, from 1984 to 1985, and compiling a record of 2–16.

Head coaching record

References

Year of birth missing (living people)
Living people
McPherson Bulldogs football coaches